Luke Adams is an American former basketball player. He played college basketball for the Lamar Cardinals from 1969 to 1971.

Adams was from LaBelle, Florida. He led the Cardinals in points and rebounds during the two seasons he played. Adams was named as the Southland Player of the Year alongside Allan Pruett of the Arkansas State Red Wolves in 1971. He was a two-time selection to the All-Southland team.

Adams was selected by the Los Angeles Lakers as the 132nd overall pick in the 1971 NBA draft. He was also chosen by the Carolina Cougars in the 1971 American Basketball Association (ABA) draft. Adams had three agents unsuccessfully negotiate a contract with Cougars president Carl Scheer before he travelled 1,200 miles by car to personally meet with Scheer and discuss a deal. He signed with the Cougars on May 2, 1971.

Adams was inducted into the Lamar Cardinal Hall of Honor in 2000. In 2013, the Southland Conference announced he was a member of its 1970s All-Decade Men's Basketball Team.

References

External links
College statistics

Year of birth missing (living people)
Living people
American men's basketball players
Basketball players from Florida
Forwards (basketball)
Lamar Cardinals basketball players
Los Angeles Lakers draft picks
People from Hendry County, Florida